Saint John's College or variations may refer to:

Australia 
 St John's College, University of Queensland, a residential college on the St Lucia campus of the university
 St John's College, University of Sydney, a Roman Catholic residential college of the university
 St John's College, Darwin, a Roman Catholic secondary school in the Northern Territory
 Saint John's College, Whyalla, formerly a Roman Catholic secondary school in South Australia
 St John's College, Woodlawn, a Roman Catholic secondary school, near Lismore, New South Wales
 St John's Anglican College, Brisbane, an Anglican primary and secondary school in the Forest Lake suburb, Queensland
 St John's Regional College, is a Roman Catholic secondary school in Dandenong, Victoria
 St John's Theological College, Melbourne, a former Anglican theological college in Melbourne, Victoria
 St John's College, Morpeth, a former Anglican theological college originally in Armidale and then Morpeth, New South Wales
 St John's Theological College, Perth, a former Anglican theological college in Perth, Western Australia

Canada 
St. John's College (Brantford), a Roman Catholic high school in Ontario
St. John's College, University of British Columbia, a residential college of the university
St. John's College, University of Manitoba, an Anglican college of the university

India 
 St. John's College, Agra, a college affiliated to Dr. Bhim Rao Ambedkar University
 St. John's College, Palayamkottai, a college of the Diocese of Tirunelveli of the Church of South India
 St. John's Medical College, a private college and hospital in Bangalore

Ireland 
St. John's College, Waterford, formerly a Roman Catholic seminary for the diocese of Waterford and Lismore
St. John's Central College, a further education college in Cork
St John's College De La Salle, a Roman Catholic secondary school in Ballyfermot, Dublin

New Zealand 
 St John's College, Auckland, an Anglican theological college in Meadowbank, Auckland, North Island
 St John's College, Hamilton, a state-integrated, Catholic boys' secondary school in Hamilton, North Island
 St John's College, Hastings, a state-integrated, Catholic boys' secondary school in Hastings, North Island

South Africa 
 St John's College, Johannesburg, in Houghton, Johannesburg

Sri Lanka 
 St. John's College, Colombo 09, a provincial council school
 St. John's College, Jaffna, a private secondary school in Jaffna
 St. John's College, Nugegoda, a boys' school
 St. John's College, Panadura, a national school

United Kingdom 
 St John's College, Cambridge, a college at Cambridge University, England
 St John's College, Cardiff, an independent co-educational day school in Cardiff, Wales
 St John's College, Durham, a college at Durham University, England
 St John's College, Nottingham, a Church of England theological college in Bramcote, Nottingham,  England
 St John's College, Oxford, a college at Oxford University, England
 St John's College, Portsmouth, an independent day and boarding school in Southsea, Hampshire, England
 St John's College, St Andrews, original foundation of St. Mary's College of the University of St. Andrews, Scotland, 1418–1527
 St John's College, York, now part of York St John University

United States 
 St. John's University (New York City) (formerly St. John's College)
 St. John's College (1841 until 1907) in the Bronx, New York; the progenitor of Fordham University
 St. John's College, Cleveland, two schools in Cleveland, Ohio, a grammar school (1854- ?), and a Catholic school for teachers and nurses (1928–1975)
 St. John's College (Kansas), a four-year college in Winfield, Kansas that closed in 1986
 St. John's College (Toledo, Ohio), Toledo, Ohio (1898-c.1935)
 Saint John's Seminary (Massachusetts), in Brighton, Massachusetts
 St. John's Seminary (California), in Camarillo, California
 St. John's College High School, in Washington, DC, known as St. John's College from 1887 until 1921
 St. John's College (Annapolis/Santa Fe), one college with campuses in Annapolis, Maryland and Santa Fe, New Mexico

Other locations 
 St. John's College, Belize, five educational institutions under the same management in Belize City, Belize
 St John's College, Fiji, a Roman Catholic secondary school in Cawaci
 St. John's University, Shanghai, founded as St. John's College
 St. John's College, University of Hong Kong, a residential college at the University of Hong Kong
 St. John's College (Harare), a private high school in Harare, Zimbabwe

See also
 Saint John's University (disambiguation)
 St. John's Academy (disambiguation)
 St. John's High School (disambiguation)
 Saint John's (disambiguation)
 St. John's Seminary (disambiguation)